The following are the rallycross events and series of the year 2018  throughout the world.

The following are the rallycross series which took place in 2018 throughout the world.  
Championship standings for Supercar class series at national and subregional level are displayed in this article.

Worldwide Series

FIA World Rallycross Championship

Nitro Rallycross

Regional Series

Continental Series

FIA European Rallycross Championship

Americas Rallycross Championship

Subregional Series

RallyX Nordic - Supercar
(key)

Note: Despite there being 41 drivers competing in the races in this championship, only 19 were eligible for the championship standings.

FIA CEZ Rallycross - Supercar
(key)

Note: Despite there being 30 drivers competing in the races in this championship, only 12 were eligible for the championship standings.

National Series

MSA British Rallycross Championship
(key)

Note 1: There were four "guest drivers" in Round 1. Guest drivers do appear in MSA Rallycross standings but cannot score points.
Note 2: Only the points from each driver's best seven results are counted towards the championship. Steve Hill was docked two points in addition to this

Rallicross SM - Supercar
(key)

Note: Despite there being 20 drivers competing in the races in this championship, only 14 were eligible for the championship standings.

Championnat de France de Rallycross - Supercar
(key)

Campionato Italiano Rallycross - Supercar
(key)

''Note: As rounds 2 and 3 doubled as FIA CEZ Rallycross rounds, non-Italian drivers participated in the races but did not score points in the Italian championship.

Russian Rallycross Championship - National
(key)

See also
 Rallycross

References 

 
2018 sport-related lists